Mimi Michaels (born February 22, 1983) is an American actress.

Early life 
Michaels was born in Great Neck, New York. She attended LaGuardia High School of Performing Arts in New York City. After graduating, on the high school dean's advice, rather than accepting a place at the SUNY Conservatory, she moved to Los Angeles to pursue her acting career. Between acting jobs, she takes literature classes at the University of Southern California, where she majors in English.

Michaels remembers herself playing at acting characters in costume at the age of three, and acting professionally in commercials from the age of four. One of her earliest childhood television roles was on Saturday Night Live in 1991. She has a family acting connection: her maternal grandparents had acted in vaudeville and stage drama, and her brother Fred works for a film production company and as a writer.

Acting career 
Michaels's first part in Los Angeles was the title role in Sister Aimee: The Aimee Semple McPherson Story, (aka Aimee Semple McPherson, 2006). She played the evangelical preacher from the age of 15 into her 40s, which was a challenge for her developing acting skills.
She had leading roles in several web series, the vampire movie 30 Days of Night: Dust to Dust (2008), the parody House of Heather, and the MTV Films horror series Savage County. In 2009, Michaels also had notable supporting roles in the big screen horror film Boogeyman 3, and the NBC television disaster miniseries Meteor: Path to Destruction.

Filmography

Film

Television

Video games

References

External links
 

1983 births
Living people
American film actresses
University of Southern California alumni
American television actresses
People from Great Neck, New York
Actresses from New York (state)
American child actresses
Fiorello H. LaGuardia High School alumni
20th-century American actresses
21st-century American actresses
American video game actresses